Menachem (Marc) Penner (Hebrew: מנחם פעננער; born 1971) is an American Modern Orthodox rabbi who is the Max and Marion Grill Dean of the Rabbi Isaac Elchanan Theological Seminary of Yeshiva University. He is also the Dean of Men's Undergraduate Torah Studies Program at Yeshiva University. Penner is the Rabbi Emeritus of the  Young Israel of Holliswood.

Education 
Following high-school, Penner attended Yeshivat Har Etzion in 1988, then headed by Aharon Lichtenstein and Yehuda Amital. He graduated from Yeshiva College in 1991 and received Semicha from RIETS in 1994.

Career 
Penner served as the spiritual leader of the Young Israel of Holliswood in Queens for 20 years, a position he was elected to in 1996. He is now the Rabbi Emeritus. He continues to teach, focusing on Tanach, Tefillah and Machshavah in Queens and in communities worldwide.

In 2013, Penner was elected Max and Marion Grill Dean of the Rabbi Isaac Elchanan Theological Seminary. He succeeded Yona Reiss and began his deanship on July 1, 2013.

Personal 
Penner is the parent of an individual with special needs. He speaks across the United States on issues of families facing disabilities. Penner also has a son who is a member of the LGBTQ community.

References 

1971 births
Living people
American Modern Orthodox rabbis
Deans (academic)
21st-century American rabbis
Yeshiva University alumni
Rabbi Isaac Elchanan Theological Seminary semikhah recipients
Yeshivat Har Etzion
Yeshiva University faculty